Seafield is a coastal strip situated on the Firth of Forth between Leith and Portobello in north-east Edinburgh, Scotland. The area is mainly commercial, and has little housing.

The area is home to Edinburgh Dog and Cat Home, which cares for around 150 of Edinburgh and the Lothians' lost and abandoned cats and dogs.

The Eastern General Hospital was based here until being demolished in 2008. Its maternity unit served North East Edinburgh and the Borders until 1997.

Seafield Cemetery and Crematorium

Dating from 1889 the cemetery has an impressive entrance lodge and gates in the style of Kinross House. The crematorium dates from 1938 and was designed by the Leith architect W. N. Thomson. The cemetery has a columbarium and Italian style section to the south. There are few notable monuments or interments:

Bernard Hunter, businessman
Thomas Bernard Mouat surgeon and medical author
Robertson Fotheringham Ogilvie FRSE pathologist
Rev David Brown Spence, missionary
Raimondo Nicolo de Pinto and John James de Pinto, Greek consuls
Alex Young (1880-1959) footballer (the previously unmarked grave had a stone placed by Everton Heritage Society in January 2017.

There are a high number of war graves, partly due to the cemetery's proximity to the Eastern General Hospital, which served as a military hospital during the Second World War. There are also a number of trawlermen buried in war graves, due to the government conscripting both boats and crews to serve in mine clearance duties during the First World War. The crews were officially part of the Royal Navy Reserve during this period. Here are buried 185 Commonwealth service personnel of the First World War, some buried in the Military Plot in Section B or the Admiralty Plot in Section M, otherwise scattered throughout the cemetery. Those whose graves could not be marked are listed on a Screen Wall memorial. There 104 service personnel from the Second war, including 5 unidentified sailors, many buried in a plot in Section P, facing which is a memorial to 22 service personnel of the latter war cremated at the crematorium. A group of Canadian war graves lie close to the main entrance including two members of the Canadian Forestry Corps. Robert Pringle of the 7th Royal Scots was killed in the Gretna Disaster.

Several naval graves hide deeper sadness as each represents either someone dying from wounds or disease, often far from home, or bodies washed up on the shores of the Firth of Forth:-

Radio Operator Glyndwr B Brown (1920-1941) died if wounds sustained on SS Dalemoor when she was captured by German forces June 1941.
O/s W. H. Clarke (1921-1939) 18 year old who died of wounds received on HMS Cossack.
S/Lt C Dobson, C L Baldwin, Lt D B Johnstone (in command), all from HMT Firefly a trawler converted to minesweeper destroyed by a loose British mine in Firth of Forth on 3 February 1940
A/s G. Gray killed in a torpedo attack by a U-boat on his ship SS Malvina of Flamborough Head on 2 August 1918
Fireman J. Henderson died 9 January 1919 following an attack on his ship SS Northumbria
Hendrik V D Hoogh (1900-1944) Dutch seaman from Dordrecht
Seaman Willem Adriaan Staalenburg (1924-1940) from Pijnacker in the Netherlands, 16 year old, died of wounds received in North Sea, and Hermanus Natzijl (1890-1940) from Rotterdam and served on the same ship
A/s C E J Ricketts of Barrage Vessel 42 and A/s E Murt of HMS Flint Castle killed by an accidental explosion in Leith Docks on 22 December 1943
Five men killed in November 1939 due to the collision of HMS Cossack and SS Borthwick in the Firth of Forth

Seafield Waste Water Treatment Works
Located on the northern side of the A199 is the Seafield Waste Water Treatment Works (WWTW), the largest waste water treatment works in  Scotland.  Operated by Scottish Water, this facility processes 300 million litres of waste water every day (enough to fill 121 Olympic-sized swimming pools), with sufficient future capacity for a population of 850,000 people. There is also a Combined Heat and Power plant and Thermal Hydrolysis to generate up to 2300 kilowatts of sustainable electricity from waste gases, enough to power up to 600 homes, as well as treating the residual waste for agricultural use. Also located on the site is Veolia Water Outsourcing Ltd.

Although a multi-million pound Odour Improvement Plan was instigated in 2012, in 2021 a further £10 million investment in improved sludge storage commenced following numerous complaints from local residents regarding strong odours emanating  from the facility.

References 

Areas of Edinburgh
Leith